Okrouhlá may refer to places in the Czech Republic:

Okrouhlá (Blansko District), a municipality and village in the South Moravian Region
Okrouhlá (Česká Lípa District), a municipality and village in the Liberec Region
Okrouhlá (Cheb District), a municipality and village in the Karlovy Vary Region
Okrouhlá (Písek District), a municipality and village in the South Bohemian Region